Erlanger's lark (Calandrella blanfordi erlangeri) is a small passerine bird of the lark family endemic to the highlands of Ethiopia. The name of this bird commemorates the German ornithologist Carlo von Erlanger.

It is considered to be a subspecies of Blanford's lark. Alternate names include Erlanger's red-capped lark, Erlanger's short-toed lark and Ethiopian short-toed lark.

References

Updates to Birds of the World: A Checklist by James F. Clements. Fifth Edition. 2000.

Erlanger's lark
Endemic birds of Ethiopia
Erlanger's lark
Taxa named by Oscar Neumann